Christian Pfannberger (born 9 December 1979) is an Austrian former professional road racing cyclist. He was a two-time Austrian national road-race champion (2007 and 2008). Other achievements included winning the U23 National Championship in 2001 and the Giro del Capo, a stage race in South Africa in 2008. In spring 2008 he had top 10 finishes in all three of the Ardennes classics. Pfannberger was handed a lifetime ban by the Austrian National Anti-Doping Agency for his second doping violation.

Doping 
Pfannberger served a two-year suspension between 2004 and 2006 for a positive testosterone test. In May 2009, he was suspended by Team Katusha pending clarification of a non-negative doping test at an out-of-competition control in March of that year. He had been on Katusha's preliminary start list for the 2009 Giro d'Italia, but he was suspended and replaced by Alexander Serov when news of the positive test broke.

On 29 June, it was announced that his B sample had also tested positive, and that he would face a hearing in the next eight weeks which could result in Pfannberger being suspended for a period ranging from eight years to a lifetime ban.

Pfannberger was subsequently handed a lifetime ban by the Austrian National Anti-Doping Agency for his second doping violation. He has consistently maintained that he has never doped, and will challenge the lifetime ban.

Major achievements 

2001
 (U23)  National Road Race Champion
 (U23) Thüringen-Rundfahrt & 1 stage

2006
 3rd Overall, Tour of Austria
 1st, Stage 3

2007
  National Road Race Champion

2008 – Barloworld
 1st, Overall, Giro del Capo
 1st, Stage 1
 6th, Amstel Gold Race
 9th, La Flèche Wallonne
 5th, Liège–Bastogne–Liège
  National Road Race Champion
 8th, 2008 UCI Road World Championships

2009
 4th, GP Miguel Indurain
 9th, Amstel Gold Race

References

External links 

1979 births
Living people
People from Judenburg
Austrian male cyclists
Cyclists at the 2008 Summer Olympics
Olympic cyclists of Austria
Austrian sportspeople in doping cases
Doping cases in cycling
Sportspeople from Styria